Nadel may refer to:
 Nadel (surname)
 Needle (disambiguation) (Nadel in German)
 Nadil, Azerbaijan

See also
Nadal (surname)